City West is a 1984 Australian TV series about a migrant community.

References

External links
City West at IMDb

Special Broadcasting Service original programming
Australian drama television series
1984 Australian television series debuts